We Cellar Children (originally Wir Kellerkinder) is a 1960 West German film directed by Hans-Joachim Wiedermann.

Plot summary

Cast

Soundtrack

External links 
 
 

1960 films
1960 comedy-drama films
1960s German-language films
1960s satirical films
German black-and-white films
German comedy-drama films
German satirical films
West German films
Films about communism
Films about Nazi Germany
Films set in Berlin
Films set in the 1930s
Films set in the 1940s
Films set in the 1950s
Films set in psychiatric hospitals
Cold War films
Jazz films
1960s German films